Corula is a monotypic moth genus in the family Geometridae. Its only species, Corula geometroides, the ash-grey geometrid, is found in Australia. Both the genus and species were first described by Francis Walker in 1856.

References

Nacophorini
Monotypic moth genera